is a Japanese professional wrestler currently signed to New Japan Pro-Wrestling (NJPW).

Early life
Umino was born on April 13, 1997, in the special ward of Setagaya in Tokyo, Japan. He is the son of NJPW referee Hiroyuki Umino (also known under his ring name of "Red Shoes Unno").

Professional wrestling career

New Japan Pro-Wrestling

Young Lion (2017–2019)
Umino made his professional wrestling debut for New Japan Pro-Wrestling (NJPW)'s developmental territory Lion's Gate on April 13, 2017, losing to Taka Michinoku at the Lion's Gate Project 4. He then made his debut for NJPW's main roster at Road to Wrestling Dontaku 2017 on April 22, under the slightly modified ring name of Shota Umino, as a "young lion", losing to fellow young lion Hirai Kawato. Umino obtained his first win in a six-man tag team match on the first night of the Best of the Super Juniors 24 event, teaming with Tomoyuki Oka and Volador Jr. to defeat Tetsuhiro Yagi, Katsuya Kitamura and A. C. H., after Oka pinned Yagi. Throughout the following months, Umino would split his time between NJPW's main roster and Lion's Gate. Umino would compete in the 2017 Young Lion Cup, but did not win, with a final standing of 4 points (two wins and three losses).

In April 2018, Umino main evented Lion's Gate Project 11, where he teamed with Yuji Nagata in a loss to Ayato Yoshida and Go Asakawa. Umino would then lose to Yoshida in a singles match in the main event of Lion's Gate Project 13 in June. Umino and Yoshida would subsequently form a tag team and competed in the 2018 World Tag League later that year, but lost all of their matches and ending with a final tally of 0 points (0 wins and 13 losses). Umino also wrestled in the 2019 New Japan Cup tournament, but lost to Hiroshi Tanahashi in the first round.

At Dominion 6.9 in Osaka-jo Hall on June 9, Umino lost to IWGP United States Champion Jon Moxley. Following the loss, Moxley would state his appreciation of Umino's efforts and adopt Umino as his tag team partner and manager for matches - dubbing him "Shooter". Their debut as a team was a loss to Jeff Cobb and Ren Narita on July 14, which they lost after Umino was pinned by Cobb. The two's partnership was halted when Moxley took a hiatus from NJPW after the end of the 2019 G1 Climax in August and began to wrestle more regularly for American promotion All Elite Wrestling.

At Royal Quest on August 31, Umino teamed with Ren Narita and Ryusuke Taguchi in a loss to Roppongi 3K (Rocky Romero, Sho and Yoh). Umino would then move onto compete in the 2019 Young Lion Cup. Although he would lose his first tournament match to Clark Connors, Umino would win his next four matches against Ren Narita, Michael Richards, Yuya Uemura, Alex Coughlin and Yota Tsuji, but lost the final match of the tournament to Karl Fredericks, failing to win the tournament with a final score of 10 points. Following the end of the tournament, it was announced that Umino would begin a learning excursion in the United Kingdom.

Foreign excursion (2019–2022)
Umino made his debut for Revolution Pro Wrestling (RevPro) at the New Beginnings event on November 9, 2019, in a loss to Kyle Fletcher. He had previously wrestled for RevPro in 2018, during NJPW and Revpro's collaborative two-night event Strong Style Evolved UK. Umino also made his debut for Over the Top Wrestling (OTT) at the promotion's Stickin' Out event on January 5, 2020, where he lost to Scotty Davis. On January 18, Umino won RPW's 40-man Revolution Rumble battle royal. After an absence of over a year due to the COVID-19 pandemic, Umino made his return to wrestling at RevPro Live In Bristol 3 event in July 2021, defeating Dan Moloney. At RevPro's Uprising event in November, Umino challenged Will Ospreay for the Undisputed British Heavyweight Championship, but was defeated. In May of the following year, Umino challenged Michael Oku for the Undisputed British Cruiserweight Championship, but was defeated. In July, Umino unsuccessfully challenged Pac for the AEW All-Atlantic Championship.

Return from excursion (2022–present)

Umino would make his return to New Japan Pro-Wrestling, on April 16, 2022, at Windy City Riot, where he answered Jay White's open challenge but was defeated. At AEW x NJPW: Forbidden Door, Umino teamed with Eddie Kingston and Wheeler Yuta in a six-man tag-team match, where they lost to Chris Jericho, Sammy Guevara and Minoru Suzuki. In September, Umino made his NJPW Strong debut, defeating Q.T. Marshall at Autumn Action. In October at Royal Quest II, Umino lost to Will Ospreay. Umino made his return to Japan on November 5 at Battle Autumn, where he confronted and attacked Ospreay and his United Empire stablemates, challenging Ospreay to a rematch, however this time for Ospreay's IWGP United States Heavyweight Championship. The match was set to take place on November 20th at Historic X-Over, where Umino once again was defeated by Ospreay.

Championships and accomplishments
 Pro Wrestling Illustrated
 Ranked No. 334 of the top 500 singles wrestlers in the PWI 500 in 2019
Revolution Pro Wrestling
 Revolution Rumble (2020)

References

External links
 
 

1997 births
Living people
Sportspeople from Tokyo
Japanese male professional wrestlers